The islet kingfisher (Todiramphus colonus) is a species of bird in the family Alcedinidae.

Distribution
It is endemic to islands in the Louisiade Archipelago, within Papua New Guinea.

Its natural habitats are subtropical or tropical moist lowland forests and plantations.

Taxonomy
It was formerly considered a subspecies of the Collared kingfisher.

References

islet kingfisher
Birds of Papua New Guinea
Endemic fauna of Papua New Guinea
islet kingfisher